The North London Waste Authority (NLWA) is a waste disposal authority with responsibility for disposal of waste in the North London boroughs of Barnet, Camden, Enfield, Hackney, Haringey, Islington, and Waltham Forest.

History
The NLWA was established on 1 April 1986 as a joint arrangement under part II of the Local Government Act 1985. It replaced the Greater London Council in part of north London. The establishment of joint committees for this purpose was voluntary. The boroughs could have become individual waste disposal authorities. Each was already, and continued to be, responsible for waste collection.

In 2012, French transnational company Veolia was forced to withdraw its tender for £4.7 billion worth of contracts with the NLWA after sustained local opposition due to its involvement in illegal Israeli settlements. The campaign was supported by some Labour Party councillors and the Palestine Solidarity Campaign.

Members

Role
The function of the NLWA is to transport and dispose of waste collected in each of the seven North London boroughs it is responsible for.
This is undertaken by a wholly owned subsidiary, LondonWaste Limited.

Its wholly owned subsidiary LondonEnergy Ltd operates the Edmonton EcoPark.

References

External links
 LondonEnergy

Greater London Council replacement organisations
Local government in London
Waste management in London
Waste disposal authorities
1986 establishments in the United Kingdom
Waste organizations
Organizations established in 1986